Jovan Nikolić (Cyrillic: Joвaн Николић, born 21 July 1991 in Nikšić) is a Montenegro football defensive midfielder who plays for Montenegrin First League club FK Dečić.

Club career

Budućnost Podgorica
He was part of the FK Budućnost Podgorica youth system and he made a debut for their senior squad in the 2008–09 Montenegrin First League. He played with them during the following two seasons, with the exception of the six-month loan to another Montenegrin top league club FK Sutjeska Nikšić during the 2010–11 season. While with Budućnost, he played in both 2009–10 and 2010–11 UEFA Europa League qualification matches.

Hajduk Kula
In summer 2011 he moved to Serbia and signed with FK Hajduk Kula. He made his debut in the 2011–12 Serbian SuperLiga round 2 home match against FK BSK Borča on 21 August 2011.

Sutjeska Nikšić
During the winter break of the 2011–12 season, he returned to Montenegro and rejoined FK Sutjeska Nikšić.

International career
Jovan Nikolić had been a regular member of the Montenegro national under-19 football team since 2009, and since 2010 he occasionally received calls for the Montenegro national under-21 football team.

Honours
Sutjeska
Montenegrin First League: 2012–13, 2013–14

References

1991 births
Living people
Footballers from Nikšić
Association football midfielders
Montenegrin footballers
Montenegro youth international footballers
Montenegro under-21 international footballers
FK Budućnost Podgorica players
FK Sutjeska Nikšić players
FK Hajduk Kula players
FC Akzhayik players
OFK Titograd players
FK Podgorica players
FK Dečić players
Montenegrin First League players
Serbian SuperLiga players
Kazakhstan Premier League players
Montenegrin expatriate footballers
Expatriate footballers in Serbia
Montenegrin expatriate sportspeople in Serbia
Expatriate footballers in Albania
Montenegrin expatriate sportspeople in Albania
Expatriate footballers in Kazakhstan
Montenegrin expatriate sportspeople in Kazakhstan